XHPJOA-FM and XHPUAY-FM are radio stations broadcasting on 98.1 MHz in Navojoa, Sonora and 90.9 MHz in Guaymas, owned by the Expreso newspaper. The stations form a simulcast known as Pop Extremo, carrying a pop format.

XHPJOA transmits from a tower atop Cerro Prieto, while XHPUAY broadcasts from Cerro El Vigía.

History
Medios y Editorial de Sonora initially won two stations, one each in Guaymas and Navojoa, in the IFT-4 station auction of 2017. This included XHPJOA, which cost 6.5 million pesos. XHPUAY was subsequently won after the initial winning bidder for the frequency dropped out, with a winning bid of 12 million pesos.

The stations signed on at the end of August 2018 in a simulcast.

References

Radio stations in Sonora
Radio stations established in 2018
2018 establishments in Mexico